Mardirahu is a former island in Estonia. Mardirahu has merged with the island of Tauksi, an uninhabited island located north of Puise Peninsula in Matsalu National Park.

See also
List of islands of Estonia

Islands of Estonia
Ridala Parish